Agrotis psammocharis is a moth of the family Noctuidae. It is found in the Alborz Mountains in Iran and the Turkestan and Mount Hermon in the Golan Heights.

Adults are on wing in October and they breed once each year.

External links
 Noctuinae of Israel

Agrotis
Moths of the Middle East
Moths described in 1950